Gim Toro is an Italian comic book series created by  Andrea Lavezzolo and Edgardo Dell'Acqua. It was in syndication from 1946 until 1951.

Background 
Published in 1946 in an eponymous comic book series, the comics had an immediate success; in 1947 the main series was joined by the parallel series Gimtorissimo, still written by Lavezzolo but with illustrations by other artists. The success lasted until the beginning of 1950, and the series ended in 1951. It was republished several times until the second half of seventies.  The main character, Gim Toro, is an Italian-American by the appearance of actor Tyrone Power.

See also
Other comics series created by Andrea Lavezzolo:
Tony Falco (1948–1949) 
Geky Dor (1949–1950)
Kinowa (1950–1961)
Il Piccolo Ranger (1958–1985)

References 

Italian comics titles
Italian comics characters
Comics characters introduced in 1946
1946 comics debuts
1951 comics endings
Crime comics
Fictional Italian people